Trampa Infernal is a 1989 Mexican horror film written and directed by Pedro Galindo III, and co-written by Santiago Galindo.

Plot 

A group of teenagers intend to hunt a bear and are stalked by a masked madman Vietnam veteran.

Cast 

 Pedro Fernández as Nacho
 Edith González as Alejandra
 Toño Mauri as Mauricio
 Charly Valentino as Charly
 Marisol Santacruz as Carlota
 Adriana Vega as Viviana
 Alfredo Gutiérrez as Mr. Jeremías
 Alberto Mejia Baron as Jesse
 Armando Galván as Javier

Reception 

Dread Central's Steve Barton had a positive response to the film, calling it "pure unadulterated grade-B entertainment" with deaths that "pack an interesting punch." Brett Gallman of Oh, the Horror! found that while the film was "not particularly great" it was still "a goofy bit of fun" with nice photography and "fairly decent bloodletting."

References

External links 

 

1989 films
1989 horror films
1980s slasher films
Mexican slasher films
1980s Spanish-language films
1980s Mexican films